The 1922–23 Divizia A was the eleventh season of Divizia A, the top-level football league of Romania.

Participating teams

Final Tournament of Regions

Quarters

1 Brașovia failed to appear, so it lost the game with 0–3 by administrative decision.

Semifinals

Final
August 26, 1923, Cluj-Napoca

References

Liga I seasons
Romania
1922–23 in Romanian football